St. Luke's Boys' High School, Kimilili is a provincial, public, boys' high school located in Kimilili, near Bungoma in Kenya's Western Province. It was known as Kimilili Boys' High School until January 2009.

Motto
"Discipline, hard work and success."

History
The school was opened on 2 June 1968, at around 8:30 AM. Officially, it operated "illegally" until August of that year, which led to its closure by the AEO of the area. The Ministry of Education Permanent Secretary then helped in restarting and re-registering the school.

The school was initially mixed, the first students being 35 boys and 5 girls.

The first headboy was Joseph Simiyu Wachilonga, and the first headgirl was Eunice Nelima Werangai.

Principals
 Henry Makila – 1968–1969
 J. L. Wanakai – 1969–1975
 John O Were – 1976–1987
 Mathew Bigambo – 1987–1989
 Meshack L'Lanziva – 1990–2001
 John Khisa –2003 – September 2007
 Patrick Wandili – since September 2007 to Dec 2017; Mr. Wandili was deputy principal under Mr. Khisa and assumed the role of head after his retirement.
 Nyariki Zachary - former Chief Principal -[Since December 2017]- formerly at Cardinal Otunga High School Mosocho -Kisii County.

Uniform
Official wear
 White long or short-sleeved shirt for normal students, while blue for prefects
 Black trouser
 Maroon tie
 Maroon pullover
 Maroon sleeveless sweater with school badge
 Maroon blazer with stripes for prefects
 Grey socks
 Black shoes

Sports wear
 Sneakers
 Socks
 Choice of grey, yellow, white, purple or green T-shirts (with dorm name on the back) depending on one's dormitory
 Black shorts

Sports
The school's main trophy magnet is handball. It qualifies for the East and Central Africa Sports Competition every year.

Sponsorship and partnerships
All the school's sponsors are from teacher-exchange programs of the 1970–2000 period.

Gerraint Jenkins is the most notable foreign figure in the school. He was a former teacher and is at de Stafford School in England. There are also sponsors from the Netherlands like the Meijers.

The sponsors helped the school build the administration block. Mr. Jenkins also gives prizes to the top performers in the Kenya Certificate of Secondary Education.

Alumni Kim's
In July 2009, the school began its alumni association.which has members worldwide

Rivalries
Kimilili is in academic rivalry with Friends School Kamusinga (also of Kimilili Constituency) and Lugulu Girls High school of Bungoma District.

See also

 Education in Kenya
 List of schools in Kenya

References
http://kimililiboys.ac.ke
http://www.harambeeholland.nl/engels/pro/Kimilili%20Boys%20High%20School.html
http://www.destafford.org.uk/page_viewer.asp?page=Staff+and+Governor+List&pid=15

External links
 

1968 establishments in Kenya
Boys' schools in Kenya
Bungoma County
Educational institutions established in 1968
Education in Western Province (Kenya)
Public schools in Kenya
High schools and secondary schools in Kenya